Don Bosco College, Canlubang, also referred to by its acronym DBC is a private Catholic basic and higher educational institution owned and operated by the Salesians of the Society of Saint John Bosco in Canlubang, Laguna, Philippines. It was established in 1963 by the Salesians.

History

In 1967, the Philippine government recognized that the courses in the institution were valid for a degree in Bachelor in Secondary Education (BSEd). Two years later, the school's curriculum for the course in Bachelor of Science in Industrial Education (BSIEd) was also approved. In 1972, the institution started an outreach program called Manpower Training Department (MTD), now called TVET, for low-income students.

Members of the Salesian Community 
 Joel Camaya, SDB, Rector
 Paul Michael Suarez, SDB, Administrator and TVET Director
 Robert Paul Zarate, SDB, Institutional Spiritual Moderator 
 Renato Molina, SDB, Confessor
 Romnick Tabaquero, SDB, Practical Trainee

External links 
 

Salesian schools
Salesian secondary schools
Catholic universities and colleges in the Philippines
Don Bosco schools in the Philippines
Catholic secondary schools in the Philippines
Educational institutions established in 1963
1963 establishments in the Philippines